Countrified is the eighth studio album by American country music artist John Anderson. It was released on October 6, 1986. It was his last studio album for Warner Bros. Records before leaving for MCA Nashville in 1987. The album featured "The Fightin' Side of Me", a song written and originally recorded by country singer Merle Haggard as well as a cover of the gospel standard "Peace in the Valley."

Track listing

Chart performance

Album

Singles

References

Poet, J. [ Countrified], Allmusic.

1986 albums
Warner Records albums
John Anderson (musician) albums
Albums produced by Jim Ed Norman